The Ship That Died is a 1938 American short film directed by Jacques Tourneur for MGM. Written by George Sayer and featuring John Nesbitt, Leonard Penn, and Rhea Mitchell, it presents dramatisations of a range of theories (mutiny, fear of explosion due to alcohol fumes, and the supernatural) of the ship Mary Celeste.

References

Bibliography

External links 

1938 films
1938 drama films
1938 short films
American drama short films
Metro-Goldwyn-Mayer short films
American black-and-white films
Mary Celeste
1930s American films